Fight Against Babylon is an album by keyboardist Jamie Saft's New Zion Trio which was released on the Veal label in 2011.

Reception

In his review for PopMatters, Sean Murphy notes that "What Saft manages to do on Fight Against Babylon is create an organic ambiance and, without any in-the-studio sorcery or clever manipulation (strategies he has already showcased on the aforementioned efforts), establish a deep, utterly pleasant groove". On All About Jazz, Eyal Hareuveni, said "producer and multi-instrumentalist Jamie Saft's New Zion Trio debut recording succeeds in blowing fresh winds in the traditional piano trio with dub aesthetics, citing King Tubby, Bob Marley, Bill Evans, Pharoah Sanders and Alice Coltrane as influences".

Track listing
All compositions by Jamie Saft
 "Slow Down Furry Dub" - 6:59
 "Niceness" - 5:44
 "The Red Dies" - 7:15
 "Gates" - 4:59
 "Hear I Jah" - 9:36
 "I Shense" - 5:22
 "Lost Dub" - 8:45
 "Fire Blaze" - 9:44

Personnel
Jamie Saft - piano, organ
Larry Grenadier - bass 
Craig Santiago - drums

References

Jamie Saft albums
2011 albums